Kurt Edwin Simon Okraku (born  1971) is a Ghanaian football administrator who serves as the President of the Ghana Football Association since October 2019. He is a former sports journalist and past Executive Chairman of Dreams. He also served on various executive committees of the Ghana Football Association as well as the national team, Ghana Black Stars.

Early life and education 
He received his bachelor's degree from the University of Ghana. He trained as a journalist at the Ghana Institute of Journalism. He received his MBA from the University of Liverpool. While in the UK, he also received instruction in marketing, hospitality and tourism management.

Career 
He established a colt football club, Shooting Stars FC when he was 17 years old as well as the Director of the Jawara Babies Colt Club. From 1996 to 1999, he was a presenter and sports presenter for Radio Univers 105.7 FM, campus radio of the University of Ghana, Legon and concurrently served as the public relations officer for Afienya United FC, Tema and at the Public Relations Department, Ministry of Youth and Sports (1997–98) and the sports editor for Groove FM (1998–99). Between 1999 and 2000, he was the Deputy Sports Editor, Network Broadcasting Ltd, owners of Radio Gold.

He worked for sports marketing companies in the UK and Israel. He was the Communications and marketing director of Accra Hearts of Oak between 2006 and 2007. He was the administrative manager of Ghana League Clubs Association (GHALCA) from 2008 to 2010. He became general manager of Wassaman in 2011.

Ghana Football Association 
Okraku on 29 October 2019 became the president of the Ghana Football Association. He became the first president of the Ghana Football Association after the Anas "eposay" which led the Federation of International Football Association (FIFA) with the president of the republic of Ghana dissolving the Ghana FA, in 2017 Kurt E.S Okraku chaired the Ghana football Association FA cup committee.

References

Living people
Presidents of the Ghana Football Association
Fante people
University of Ghana alumni
Alumni of the University of Liverpool
1971 births
Ghanaian football chairmen and investors